RLR may refer to:
 Rahal Letterman Racing, an American auto racing team
 Range Life Records, an American record label
 Regular local ring
 Richard Lloyd Racing, a defunct British auto racing team
 RIG-I-like receptor, a family of intracellular receptors
 Ruislip Lido Railway, a miniature railway in England
 Rural Land Register, a British database of land ownership
 Retron Library Recombineering, a genetic technique that uses retrons